Ernest Hillen is a Canadian writer and journalist. A longtime editor with Saturday Night, he became best known for two memoirs which he published in the 1990s about his childhood experiences during World War II.

Background
Hillen was born in the Netherlands in 1934 as the child of a Canadian mother and a Dutch father, and the family moved to West Java, Indonesia when he was a child. However, following the Japanese Occupation of Indonesia in 1942, the family was confined to detention camps for several years. After the war ended the family moved between Canada, the Netherlands and Indonesia for several years until the 1950s, when Hillen moved to Toronto.

Writing career
He took his first job in journalism with the German-language newspaper Torontoer Zeitung, and was later a contributor to Weekend, The Idler, the Toronto Star, The Globe and Mail and The Wall Street Journal before joining Saturday Night.

While with Saturday Night, he wrote his first piece of personal journalism about his childhood. The piece, titled "The Swimming Pool", appeared in the 1990 anthology The Saturday Night Traveller. During his career, he also wrote a number of radio plays for CBC Radio.

His first book-length memoir, The Way of a Boy, was published in 1993 and detailed his childhood experiences in Indonesia. The book was a shortlisted nominee for the Trillium Book Awards in 1994. In 1995, the Japanese publishing company Kodansha bought the rights to release a translated Japanese language edition of the memoir, making it one of the first accounts of the Indonesian occupation ever published in that country.

A sequel, Small Mercies: A Boy After War, was published in 1997, and won the inaugural Viacom Writers' Trust Prize for Nonfiction.

In 2008, Hillen published A Weekend Memoir, about his experiences travelling across Canada as a journalist. Both The Way of a Boy and Small Mercies were also reissued that year.

References

Canadian magazine editors
Canadian newspaper journalists
Canadian male journalists
Canadian memoirists
Canadian male non-fiction writers
Dutch emigrants to Canada
Living people
Journalists from Toronto
Writers from Toronto
Canadian male dramatists and playwrights
Canadian radio writers
20th-century Canadian dramatists and playwrights
20th-century Canadian male writers
Place of birth missing (living people)
Year of birth missing (living people)